Joseph E. Rehal (1872-1923) was an American businessman, who is the founder of Joplin, Montana. Rehal had valuable real estate holdings and is known to have built the first four buildings of the town.

Family
Rehal was born to Elias and Bekash Rehal, both of whom were born and reared in Syria. His father Elias Rehal was engaged in the liquor business during the greater portion of his active career. Rehal's father played a major role during the Syrian revolution in the early '60s.

Early life
Rehal was born in his native place Syria. He attended school there until he was sixteen, when he entered his father's liquor business until 1888. During the same year Rehal along with his four brothers immigrated to America.

Founding Joplin
In the year 1890, Rehal reached Montana. In 1891, he went to Joplin, the city of Greater Falls. There, he was engaged in the business of dry goods. He filed a homestead in Chouteau county and subsequently founded the village of Joplin. Rehal erected the first four buildings in Joplin, one of them being Park Hotel. It was recognized as the best hotel between Havre and Shelby. Rehal along with E.C. Tolley are jointly credited for establishing the town. They promoted rival parts of the town, which led to uneven and scattered business development. They erected a large new sign by the railroad crossing facing the depot.

References

1872 births
Year of death missing
People from Liberty County, Montana
American city founders
Syrian emigrants to the United States
19th-century American businesspeople
Businesspeople from Montana